Mary Littleton (born September 7, 1957) is an American politician and a Republican member of the Tennessee House of Representatives representing District 78 since January 8, 2013.

Personal life 
Littleton has four adult children.

Representative Littleton is currently serving, or has served, on the following boards/groups in the community.
 Tennessee's Safe Baby Court Advisory Committee
Tennessee's Human Trafficking Advisory Council
23rd District Judicial Child Advocacy Board
 Dickson County Cancer Board
 Dickson County Relay for Life
 Dickson County Zoning and Planning Board
 Dickson County Sanitation Board
 Member: Cheatham County Chamber of Commerce
 Member: Dickson County Chamber of Commerce
 Dickson High Noon Rotary
 National Rifle Association

Elections

Republican Primaries

In 2012, incumbent Republican Representative Phillip Johnson retired. Littleton ran in the seven-way August 2, 2012 Republican Primary, winning with 1,273 votes (21.4%) Littleton has been unopposed in the Republican primaries in every election from 2014 until 2018.

In the 2020 election, Littleton faces James Ebb Gupton during the Republican primaries.

Tennessee House of Representatives

Tenure 
During her time in the General Assembly, Littleton has voted for six balanced budgets, to abolish the death tax, to cut the sales tax on groceries. She also supported a large increase in funding for schools. The National Rifle Association has given her an "A" rating.

In April 2017, Littleton voted against Governor Haslam's IMPROVE Act, which would help to fund road and infrastructure improvements by raising the gas and diesel tax in the state. The bill would offset those tax hikes by lowering taxes elsewhere. Referring to the state's large surplus, she said, "“When you have that much of a surplus, none of us wanted to raise taxes."

In March 2018, Littleton voted in favor of a bill to legalize medical marijuana during a meeting of the House Criminal Justice Committee. The bill ultimately died on the House floor.

During the 110th General Assembly (2017-2018), Littleton introduced legislation requiring law enforcement agencies to determine if a person arrested is a parent and, if so, if the arrest would leave a child unattended. The bill also requires law enforcement agencies to develop procedures for welfare checks of children who may be endangered by the arrest of their parent/guardian. The legislation became law.

Littleton also sponsored another, this one aimed at stopping the opioid crisis in Tennessee. This piece of legislation allows prosecutors to charge those who sell certain opioids resulting in a death with second-degree murder. The legislation was signed into law.

Committee assignments 
During the 111th General Assembly, Littleton served on the following committees.

House Judiciary Committee

Subcommittee on Children and Families, Chair

House State Government Committee

Subcommittee on Departments & Agencies

House Government Operations Committee

Other offices 
Littleton was a member of the Tennessee Republican Party State Executive Committee from 2002 to 2014, and served as vice-chairwoman from 2010 to 2014.

Before that, she served as Chairwoman of the Dickson County Republican Party.

In 2015, Littleton ran for Chair of the Tennessee Republican Party.

References

External links
Official page at the Tennessee General Assembly

Mary Littleton at Ballotpedia
Mary Littleton at the National Institute on Money in State Politics

Place of birth missing (living people)
1957 births
Living people
Republican Party members of the Tennessee House of Representatives
People from Dickson, Tennessee
Women state legislators in Tennessee
21st-century American politicians
21st-century American women politicians